Iftikhar Qaisar (1956/1957 – 17 September 2017) was an actor. He acted in Urdu, Hindko and Pashto plays and was the recipient of several accolades, including the President's Pride of Performance Award. He died on 17 September 2017.

References

1950s births
2017 deaths
Pakistani male stage actors
20th-century Pakistani male actors
21st-century Pakistani male actors